David Krejčí (born 28 April 1986) is a Czech professional ice hockey centre and alternate captain for the Boston Bruins of the National Hockey League (NHL). He was part of the Bruins' Stanley Cup win in 2011 and led the NHL in points during the 2011 and 2013 Stanley Cup playoffs. Internationally he has played for the Czech national team at several tournaments, including the 2010, 2014, and 2022 Winter Olympics and four World Championships.

Playing career
Krejčí was drafted by the Boston Bruins in the third round, 63rd overall, of the 2004 NHL Entry Draft. He was drafted out of Czech junior leagues, having played for HC Kladno. Following his selection, he moved to North America to play major junior hockey in the Quebec Major Junior Hockey League (QMJHL) for the Gatineau Olympiques for two seasons. In his two seasons with the Gatineau Olympiques, Krejčí played in 117 games recording 49 goals, recording 144 points.

Professional

Boston Bruins (2006–2021)
Krejčí turned professional in 2006–07, playing for the Bruins' American Hockey League (AHL) affiliate, the Providence Bruins. He played in his first NHL game on 30 January 2007 in a 7–1 loss against the Buffalo Sabres but suffered a concussion from Buffalo's Adam Mair during his third shift. He recorded just 2:07 minutes of ice time. Krejčí played increasingly with Boston the following season, appearing in 56 NHL games to go with 25 games for Providence. On 19 February 2008, Krejčí was involved in a shootout tie-breaker round in a Bruins road game against the Carolina Hurricanes and scored to help the Bruins take the shootout 2–1. Krejčí's shootout tally would not register as his first NHL goal, as shootout goals do not count towards a player's statistical totals. Krejčí scored his first official NHL goal one week later, on 26 February against Martin Gerber of the Ottawa Senators, the second Bruins' goal in a 4–0 home shutout. He finished his rookie NHL season with 6 goals and 27 points.

During the 2008–09 season, Krejčí scored his first NHL hat-trick on 18 December 2008 against the Toronto Maple Leafs. He registered his first two goals against starter Vesa Toskala and his third against Curtis Joseph in an 8–5 Bruins win. About the midpoint of that season, NESN's play-by-play TV announcer Jack Edwards for televised Bruins games gave Krejčí the nickname "The Matrix" due to his ability to slow down the pace of a game through his skating style and abilities on the ice. Before a game on 2 April 2009, Krejčí was named the winner of the Boston Bruins' 2009 Seventh Player Award. The award is given annually to the player who "goes beyond the call of duty and exceeds all expectations" throughout the course of the season. During the game, Krejčí assisted on a goal by Milan Lucic, the 2008 winner of the Seventh Player Award, in a 2–1 home ice victory over the Ottawa Senators. He completed his second NHL season with a then-career-high 73 points in 82 games to go with a league-high +37 plus-minus rating. On 2 June 2009, he signed a multi-year contract extension with the Bruins, reportedly a three-year contract paying an average of $3.75 million per year.

At the beginning of November 2009, Krejčí was noticeably ill; on 5 November 2009, it was confirmed that Krejčí had been diagnosed with the H1N1 virus, which sidelined him for some time.

On 5 May 2010, during the 2010 Stanley Cup playoffs, Krejčí dislocated his wrist less than five minutes into a game when he was checked at the Bruins' blue line by Philadelphia Flyers' centre Mike Richards. Surgery was needed and was performed following the game at Union Memorial Hospital in Baltimore, and Krejčí missed the remainder of the playoffs.

On 25 May 2011, in Game 6 of the Eastern Conference Finals against the Tampa Bay Lightning, Krejčí recorded his second NHL career hat-trick. He was the first Bruin to record a playoff hat-trick since Cam Neely, two decades prior. On 15 June, Krejčí and the Bruins won the team's first Stanley Cup in 39 years after defeating the Vancouver Canucks 4–0 in Game 7 of the Finals. Krejčí finished the 2011 playoffs with a playoff-leading 12 goals, 23 points and 4 game-winning goals.

On 1 March 2012, in a game against the New Jersey Devils, Krejčí scored his third career hat-trick, scoring in the first, third and overtime periods in a 4–3 win. In Game 4 of the 2013 opening round playoffs against the Toronto Maple Leafs, Krejčí scored a hat-trick, including the game-winning goal in overtime. Krejčí would also lead the league again in points in the playoffs with 26, but his team fell short to the Chicago Blackhawks 4-2 in the Finals.

On 1 October 2013, Krejčí was named an alternate captain of the Bruins. On 25 October 2013, he scored a game-winning goal with 0.8 seconds left against the San Jose Sharks and goaltender Antti Niemi.

On 3 September 2014, Krejčí signed a six-year contract extension with the Bruins. During a road game on 20 February 2015 against the St. Louis Blues, Krejčí suffered a partial tear of his MCL in his left knee, forcing him off the ice for 4–6 weeks for recovery.

During the Bruins' home game against the Toronto Maple Leafs on 8 December 2018, Krejčí became the tenth-highest scoring Bruins player of all-time (surpassing Cam Neely) when he recorded a goal and an assist in a 6–3 Bruins' win, bringing his points total to 592. Three days later, on 11 December, Krejčí played his 800th NHL game, recording three assists in a Bruins' 4–3 home win over the Arizona Coyotes. Just one week later, on 20 December, Krejčí recorded his 600th career NHL point after scoring the Bruins' third goal in a 4–1 home ice defeat of the Anaheim Ducks.

As of the end of the  season, Krejčí's 42 playoff goals ranked him seventh on the Bruins' all-time list of postseason scorers.  At that time, he was also ranked 16th in Boston history in regular-season goals scored (215), seventh in assists (515) and eighth in total points (730).

On 30 July 2021, Krejčí announced that he was leaving the NHL and intended to return to the Czech Republic to continue his career. The Bruins' general manager, Don Sweeney, indicated that the team would "keep the door open" for a return in the future if Krejčí decided to return.

HC Olomouc (2021–2022)
In his return to his roots, Krejčí returned to his first club as a junior, agreeing to a one-year contract with Czech club, HC Olomouc of the Czech Extraliga (ELH), on 2 August 2021. In the 2021–22 season, as an alternate captain with Olomouc, Krejčí led the team in scoring, notching 20 goals and 46 points through 51 regular season games. He added 5 points through 5 post-season games in a qualifying round defeat to HC Vítkovice Ridera.

Return to Boston (2022–present)
After concluding his one-year contract with Olomouc, Krejčí opted to return for a 16th season with the Bruins, agreeing to a bonus laden one-year, $1 million contract on 8 August 2022. He played his 1,000th NHL game on 16 January 2023 at TD Garden against the Philadelphia Flyers, dishing out three assists in a 6–0 victory.

International play

After the Bruins' 2007–08 season ended, Krejčí was named to the Czech national team on 26 April 2008, for the 2008 IIHF World Championships. He was named to the Czech national team for the 2010 Winter Olympics, playing centre on a line with wingers Tomáš Fleischmann and Martin Erat to open the Games.

Following the Bruins' defeat to the Tampa Bay Lightning in the second round of the 2018 playoffs, Krejčí was invited to participate at the 2018 IIHF World Championship.

Career statistics

Regular season and playoffs
Bold indicates led league

International

Awards and honours

References

External links
 

1986 births
Boston Bruins draft picks
Boston Bruins players
Czech expatriate ice hockey players in Canada
Czech expatriate ice hockey players in the United States
Czech ice hockey centres
Gatineau Olympiques players
HC Dynamo Pardubice players
Ice hockey players at the 2010 Winter Olympics
Ice hockey players at the 2014 Winter Olympics
Ice hockey players at the 2022 Winter Olympics
Living people
Olympic ice hockey players of the Czech Republic
HC Olomouc players
People from Šternberk
Providence Bruins players
Rytíři Kladno players
Stanley Cup champions
Sportspeople from the Olomouc Region